Proto-Indo-Aryan (sometimes Proto-Indic) is the reconstructed proto-language of the Indo-Aryan languages. It is intended to reconstruct the language of the Proto-Indo-Aryans. Being descended from Proto-Indo-Iranian (which in turn is descended from Proto-Indo-European), it has the characteristics of a Satem language.

History

Proto-Indo-Aryan is meant to be the predecessor of Old Indo-Aryan (1500–300 BCE), which is directly attested as Vedic and Classical Sanskrit, as well as by the Indo-Aryan superstrate in Mitanni. Indeed, Vedic Sanskrit is very close to Proto-Indo-Aryan.

Some of the Prakrits display a few minor features derived from Proto-Indo-Aryan that had already disappeared in Vedic Sanskrit.

Today, numerous modern Indo-Aryan languages are extant.

Differences from Vedic
Despite the great archaicity of Vedic, the other Indo-Aryan languages preserve a small number of conservative features lost in Vedic.

One of these is the representation of Proto-Indo-European *l and *r. Later, however, some instances of Indo-European  again surface in Classical Sanskrit, indicating that the contrast survived in an early Indo-Aryan dialect parallel to Vedic. (A dialect with only  is additionally posited to underlie Magadhi Prakrit.)

The common consonant cluster kṣ  of Vedic and later Sanskrit has a particularly wide range of Proto-Indo-European (PIE) and Proto-Indo-Iranian (PII) sources, which partly remain distinct in later Indo-Aryan languages:
 PIE *ks, *kʷs, *gs, *gʷs > PII *kš > Middle Indo-Aryan kh-, -kkh-
 PIE *dʰgʷʰ, *gʰs, *gʷʰs > PII *gʱžʱ > Middle Indo-Aryan gh-, -ggh-
 PIE *tḱ; *ǵs, *ḱs > PII *tć, *ćš > Middle Indo-Aryan ch-, -cch-
 PIE *dʰǵʰ, *ǵʰs > PII *ȷ́ʱžʱ > Middle Indo-Aryan jh-, -jh-

Further reading
Morgenstierne, Georg. "Early Iranic Influence upon Indo-Aryan." Acta Iranica, I. série, Commemoration Cyrus. Vol. I. Hommage universel (1974): 271-279.

References

External links
 Category:Proto-Indo-Aryan language on Wiktionary

Indo-Aryan
Indo-Aryan languages
Languages of India
History of India